The 1984 Los Angeles Rams season was the franchise's 47th season in the National Football League, their 48th overall, and their 39th in the Greater Los Angeles Area. The Rams looked to improve on their 9–7 record from 1983 and make the playoffs for the second consecutive season and 10th in the last 12. They improved on their record by one game, going 10–6, good enough for second place in the NFC West behind the 15–1 San Francisco 49ers. In the playoffs, the Rams lost a low-scoring game to the New York Giants at home, 16–13. During this season, second-year running back Eric Dickerson set the NFL record for most rushing yards in a season, with 2,105 yards.

Offseason

NFL Draft

Roster

Regular season

Eric Dickerson
In his second season, Dickerson continued his onslaught of the NFL record book. As a rookie, Dickerson established rookie records for most rushing attempts (390), most rushing yards gained (1,808) and most touchdowns rushing (18), including another two receiving touchdowns. His efforts earned him All-Pro, Pro Bowl, Player of the Year and Rookie of the Year honors.

Eleven times during the 1984 season, he gained more than 100 yards rushing, breaking the record of 100-yard games in a season held by O. J. Simpson. His 2,105 total yards rushing in the 1984 NFL season beat Simpson’s 1973 NFL season record of 2,003 yards rushing in a single season. To date, no one has rushed for more yards in a single NFL season. However, Simpson’s career high rushing total came in a 14-game season, whereas Dickerson’s mark was set during a 16-game season. Dickerson broke OJ’s record with a 215-yard performance in a 27–16 Rams win over the Houston Oilers in Week 15.

Schedule

Game summaries

Week 1 
In this Monday Night opener, Rams got off to a 13–0 first-quarter lead with Eric Dickerson running for a touchdown, but the Cowboys stormed back behind 343 passing yards by new QB Gary Hogeboom and a defense that held Vince Ferragamo to 11 pass completions in 33 attempts and just 84 yards, and intercepted 5 passes.

Week 2 
Mike Lansford kicked a late FG to win it. Dickerson had 102 yards rushing and CB Leroy Irvin returned a pickoff 81 yards for a touchdown.

Week 3 

Steelers defense held Dickerson to 49 yards and got 2 passing touchdowns from David Woodley. Ferragamo threw 2 more INT's, giving him eight in three games. He was injured in this game & replaced by Jeff Kemp, who would be the starter for the rest of the season. 

Starting QBs:  Los Angeles Rams: Vince Ferragamo vs Pittsburgh Steelers: David Woodley.

Vegas Line:	Pittsburgh Steelers -3.5

Over/Under	43.0 (under)

Vince Ferragamo was injured (hand) during the first half and replaced by Jeff Kemp. **

Week 4 
Dickerson ran for a touchdown and Kemp passed for another.  Bengals scored late on a touchdown pass from Ken Anderson to Cris Collinsworth and tried an onside kick, but Mike Guman scooped it up and ran for the final touchdown.

Week 5

    
    
    
    
    
    
    
    
    
    

Rams’ defense tied an NFL-record by scoring three safeties. They also held the Giants to 8 yards rushing.  Henry Ellard returned a punt 83 yards for a touchdown, and Kemp continued to play mistake-free football, passing for another touchdown. The Rams also became the most recent NFL team (the last one prior was before 1940) to score three safeties in one game as they easily defeat Phil Simms and the Giants.

Week 6 
The game lead changed six times in the second half.  The Falcons won on three rushing touchdowns by Lynn Cain and a late FG by Mick Luckhurst.

Week 7 
Dickerson ran for 175 yards.  Kemp completed only 8 passes, but three were for touchdowns. Nolan Cromwell had an interception return touchdown.

Week 8 
Rams got revenge on the road against the Falcons as Dickerson ran for 145 yards and a touchdown and Ellard caught a pass and returned another punt for touchdowns.

Week 9 (Sunday, October 28, 1984): vs. San Francisco 49ers 

Point spread: 49ers by 3
 Over/Under: 45.0 (under)
 Time of Game: 

The 49ers got 376 yards passing and 3 touchdowns from Joe Montana.  Dickerson was held to 38 rushing yards.

Week 10 
Kemp only completed 5 of 14 passes with one touchdown to Ron Brown and Dickerson rushed for 208 yards; Dickerson accounted for almost all of the Rams' 261 yards of offense.  Lansford kicked a FG late to win the game as the Rams defense sacked Neil Lomax six times, three by veteran Jack Youngblood

Week 11 
Rams continued their playoff push by overcoming a 10–0 deficit behind 149 yards and 2 touchdowns by Dickerson.

Week 12 
Eddie Lee Ivery ran for 3 touchdowns and Tim Lewis returned an interception 99 yards for another.

Week 13 
In a wild affair at Tampa, the Rams overcame 322 yards passing by Steve DeBerg and scored 17 4th quarter points.  The Rams rushed for 299 yards, 191 by Dickerson along with 3 touchdowns.

Week 14 
Rams built a 24–7 halftime lead and cruised behind 2 Kemp touchdown passes and 149 yards and a touchdown from Dickerson.

Week 15 

The Rams clinched a wild-card playoff berth and Dickerson surpassed O. J. Simpson's NFL single-season rushing record by rushing for a season-high 215 yards. 
Eric Dickerson sets NFL single season rushing record in the game.
Jack Youngblood missed his first NFL game due to injury in his career.

Week 16 (Friday, December 14, 1984): at San Francisco 49ers 

Point spread: 49ers by 6
 Over/Under: 44.0 (under)
 Time of Game: 

The 49ers got two early touchdown passes from Montana and held off a late Ram charge for the win, culminating in a sack for a safety by Gary "Big Hands" Johnson. With this win, the 49ers became the first team in NFL history to win 15 games in an NFL regular season.

Postseason

Standings

Awards and honors
 Eric Dickerson, NFC Pro Bowl Selection
 Eric Dickerson, All-Pro Selection
 Eric Dickerson, UPI NFC Player of the Year

Milestones
 Eric Dickerson, NFL Record 2,105 Rushing Yards in a Single Season

See also
Other Anaheim–based teams in 1984
California Angels (Anaheim Stadium)
 1984 California Angels season

References

External links
1984 Los Angeles Rams Season at Pro-Football Reference

Los Angeles Rams
Los Angeles Rams seasons
Los Ang